Nakagawa (中川 lit. "central river") may refer to:

Places
 Nakagawa (Teshio) District in Kamikawa, Hokkaidō
 Nakagawa (Tokachi) District in Tokachi, Hokkaidō
 Nakagawa, Fukuoka
 Nakagawa, Hokkaidō
 Nakagawa, Nagano
 Nakagawa, Tochigi
 Nakagawa, Tokushima
 Nakagawa, Nanyo in Yamagata Prefecture

Other uses
Nakagawa (surname)

See also
 Naka River (disambiguation)